The following is a history of the list of games played between NBA and international teams. Teams from the National Basketball Association (NBA) have played numerous basketball games against various international teams from around the world. NBA teams, from both the United States and Canada, have played many games against international clubs from various different basketball leagues, as well as against some league all-star teams and national teams.

Some of these games have been played under NBA rules, while some of them have been played under a mixture of both NBA and FIBA rules. Since 2003, games played against EuroLeague and EuroCup teams are played under NBA rules, with either 3 NBA referees, or 2 NBA referees and one EuroLeague ref, depending on whether the games take place in the United States/Canada, or in Europe.

History
One of the first basketball games between an NBA and a FIBA (international) team was held in 1978, in Tel Aviv, Israel. Maccabi Tel Aviv of the EuroLeague and Israeli League, surprisingly beat the defending NBA champion Washington Bullets, by a score of 98–97.

Since then, 6 other EuroLeague teams have defeated an NBA franchise: Barcelona, Málaga and Real Madrid from the Spanish League, CSKA Moscow of the Russian Championship, Fenerbahçe from the Turkish League, and Alba Berlin from the German League.

In addition to defeating the Washington Bullets in 1978, Maccabi Tel Aviv also beat the New Jersey Nets and Phoenix Suns in 1984, in Israel, and beat the Toronto Raptors, 103–105, in Toronto in 2005. This was the first loss of an NBA team in North American soil.

The first Barcelona and CSKA wins came during the 2006 NBA Europe Live Tour, where Barcelona beat the Philadelphia 76ers 104–99, and the Moscow team won by 19 over the Los Angeles Clippers (94–75), being the widest victory so far of any international team.

During the 2007 NBA Europe Live Tour, Málaga defeated Memphis Grizzlies 102–99, and Real Madrid overcame Toronto by a narrow 104–103. In 2010, Barcelona and CSKA Moscow again, beat NBA teams, by narrow margins. More recent EuroLeague victories came during the 2012 NBA Europe Live Tour, when Fenerbahçe Ülker defeated the Boston Celtics, by a score of 97–91, and Barcelona beat the Dallas Mavericks, by a score of 99–85. In 2013, CSKA beat the Minnesota Timberwolves by a score of 108–106, and in 2014, Alba Berlin beat the San Antonio Spurs by a score of 94–93. In 2016, Real Madrid beat the Oklahoma City Thunder in overtime, by a score of 142–137.

These games were initially played as part of the now-defunct McDonald's Championship, where NBA teams won all of the games. Since 2006, they are mostly played during the NBA Europe Live Tour and the EuroLeague American Tour.

In addition to that, one senior men's national team, the Soviet Union, beat the Atlanta Hawks, by a score of 132–123, in an exhibition game in Moscow, in 1988.

NBA vs. international teams

1970s

1980s

1990s

2000s

2010s

2020s

NBA champions vs EuroLeague champions

NBA teams

International teams

See also
 NBA Global Games
 NBA Canada Series
 NBA versus EuroLeague games
 McDonald's Championship
 EuroLeague American Tour
 Naismith Cup

References

External links
History of Games Played by NBA Teams in Europe
Previous exhibition games European clubs vs. NBA
List of games at Spanish League forums

NBA vs. FIBA games

National Basketball League (Australia)